Bhagwant University is a co-educational private university located in Ajmer, Rajasthan, India. Bhagwant University is a privately funded by Bhagwant Group of Institutions, established in 1999, and State University established through an act of State Legislature of Rajasthan. It is registered with the University Grants Commission under Section 2(f) of UGC Act 1956.

The courses are approved by Bar Council of India (BCI), National Council of Teacher's Education (NCTE), and Pharmacy Council of India. Bhagwant University follows standards of the All India Council of Technical Education (AICTE) for its technical programs.

Bhagwant University is a member of the Association of Indian Universities (AIU), Federation of Indian Chambers of Commerce and Industry (FICCI), Indian Association of Physiotherapists (AIP), All India Management Association (AIMA). 

The university is located in the rural hinterland of Ajmer.

Academic programs 
Bhagwant University offers programs in Aeronautical, Petroleum, and Mining Engineering, Agriculture Science, Education, Law, and Paramedics.

In addition to Bachelors and Masters programs, Bhagwant University also offers MPhil and PhD degrees. The university acts in accordance with the UGC norms for award of PhD degree. Peer-reviewed research articles are published by its research scholars in national and international journals and conferences. 

Bhagwant University has signed MoUs with various international universities. Gannon University (USA), University of Sheffield (UK), Norwegian University of Applied Sciences (NO), and University of Western Australia, and Regenesys Business School Johannesburg South Africa for student and faculty exchange.

References

External links

Private universities in India
Universities and colleges in Ajmer
Universities in Rajasthan
Educational institutions established in 2008
2008 establishments in Rajasthan